"Botella Tras Botella" (English: "Bottle After Bottle") is a song by Mexican rapper Gera MX and Mexican singer-songwriter Christian Nodal, released on April 23, 2021. The single received an online boost on the social media platform TikTok as Nodal teased the song on his Twitch stream weeks before the song's official release.

Since its release, the single has broken records, such as being the first Regional Mexican single to debut on the Billboard Hot 100 for the week ending May 8, 2021. "Botella Tras Botella" debuted at No. 60 on the Hot 100, earning Nodal and Gera MX their first entries.

Chart performance
In the United States, the single became the first-ever Regional Mexican song to appear on the Billboard Hot 100 chart in its 63-year-history. It debuted at No. 60 in its first week on the chart, giving Gera MX and Nodal their first Hot 100 hit. It also debuted at No. 40 on the Streaming Songs chart, while also debuting at No. 3 on Hot Latin Songs, earning Gera MX his first appearance on the chart and Nodal's 15th and new career-best, besting his 2017 song "Adiós Amor".

The song debuted in the top 10 on the Billboard Global 200 chart, entering at number nine for the week ending May 8, 2021.

Charts

Weekly charts

Year-end charts

Certifications

References

2021 singles
2021 songs
Christian Nodal songs
Songs written by Christian Nodal
Songs written by Edgar Barrera
Spanish-language songs
Ranchera songs
Universal Music Latin Entertainment singles